Ennis Whatley (born August 11, 1962) is a retired American professional basketball player who was selected by the Kansas City Kings in the first round (13th overall) of the 1983 NBA draft. Whatley played in ten NBA seasons. A 6'3" (1.90 m) and 177 lb (80 kg) guard, he played for the Chicago Bulls, the Cleveland Cavaliers, Washington Bullets, San Antonio Spurs, Atlanta Hawks, Los Angeles Clippers and Portland Trail Blazers.

Whatley's best year as a professional came during the 1986–87 season as a Bullet, when he appeared in 73 games and averaged 8.5 points per game (ppg). In 10 NBA seasons, Whatley played in a total of 385 games and scored 2,150 points, thus averaging 5.6 ppg.

He also holds the record for assists per game in Bulls history, averaging 7 assists per game.

Born and raised in Birmingham, Alabama, Whatley attended Phillips High School and the University of Alabama.

Career in the Philippines

Whatley had experienced some success in the Philippines when he played as an import in the Philippine Basketball Association in 1989.  In the Reinforced Conference of that season, he helped the San Miguel Beermen become only the second team in PBA history to achieve the Grand Slam by leading them to the third and final conference championship. He came in as a replacement for former Indiana University standout and future Sacramento Kings coach Keith Smart, who was sent home after five games.

Whatley would return to the PBA in 1990, playing for Presto Tivoli.

Life After Basketball

Whatley is now a public speaker for Inspire LLP.

See also
List of National Basketball Association players with most assists in a game

External links
Basketball-Reference.com: Ennis Whatley

1962 births
Living people
African-American basketball players
Alabama Crimson Tide men's basketball players
All-American college men's basketball players
American expatriate basketball people in Lithuania
American expatriate basketball people in the Philippines
American men's basketball players
Atlanta Hawks players
Basketball players from Birmingham, Alabama
BC Žalgiris players
Chicago Bulls players
Cleveland Cavaliers players
Connecticut Pride players
Kansas City Kings draft picks
Los Angeles Clippers players
Mississippi Jets players
McDonald's High School All-Americans
Parade High School All-Americans (boys' basketball)
Philippine Basketball Association imports
Point guards
Portland Trail Blazers players
San Antonio Spurs players
San Miguel Beermen players
Washington Bullets players
Wichita Falls Texans players
Great Taste Coffee Makers players
American expatriate basketball people in Israel
21st-century African-American people
20th-century African-American sportspeople